Frederick T. Condit (March 27, 1852 – January 1933) was an American lawyer from  Merrillan, Wisconsin who served one term as an Independent Greenback member of the Wisconsin State Assembly from Jackson County.

Background 
Condit was born in the village of Dresden, Yates County, New York, on March 27, 1852; he came to Wisconsin with his family in 1857, and they settled at Sparta. Condit received a common school education, and became a lawyer. He moved to Merrillan in Jackson County in 1877.

Public office 
In 1877 he ran as a Democrat for district attorney, but lost. He was elected as an "Independent Greenback" in 1878 with 833 votes to 811 for Republican J. R. Sechler (Republican incumbent Carl C. Pope was not a candidate for re-election). He was appointed to the standing committees on federal relations and on privileges and elections; and to the joint committee on claims.

In 1879 he ran as a Democrat for the State Senate's 32nd District (Jackson and Monroe counties), losing to William T. Price, with 3,425 votes to Price's 4,395. He was succeeded in the Assembly by Republican Robert D. Wilson.

Outside the Assembly 
Condit married Elsie Woodley on January 13, 1879. Sometime after leaving the legislature, he moved to Hudson in St. Croix County, where he became the Mayor of Hudson and was editor and manager of the Hudson Star-Observer. He died in Hudson.

References

External links

1852 births
Editors of Wisconsin newspapers
Mayors of places in Wisconsin
American newspaper editors
People from Jackson County, Wisconsin
People from Dresden, Yates County, New York
Wisconsin Greenbacks
19th-century American politicians
Wisconsin lawyers
1933 deaths
People from Sparta, Wisconsin
People from Hudson, Wisconsin
Democratic Party members of the Wisconsin State Assembly